Njenje River is a tributary of the Rufiji River that starts  in Liwale District of  Lindi Region, Tanzania. It begins in Lilombe ward and Joins the Rufiji on the border with Morogoro Region at Barikiwa ward. The river is located entirely in the Selous Game Reserve.

References

Rivers of Lindi Region
Rivers of Tanzania